Lycaenidae is the second-largest family of butterflies (behind Nymphalidae, brush-footed butterflies), with over 6,000 species worldwide, whose members are also called gossamer-winged butterflies. They constitute about 30% of the known butterfly species.

The family comprises seven subfamilies, including the blues (Polyommatinae), the coppers (Lycaeninae), the hairstreaks (Theclinae), and the harvesters (Miletinae).

Description, food, and life cycle
Adults are small, under 5 cm usually, and brightly coloured, sometimes with a metallic gloss.

Larvae are often flattened rather than cylindrical, with glands that may produce secretions that attract and subdue ants. Their cuticles tend to be thickened. Some larvae are capable of producing vibrations and low sounds that are transmitted through the substrates they inhabit. They use these sounds to communicate with ants.

Adult individuals often have hairy antenna-like tails complete with black and white annulated (ringed) appearance. Many species also have a spot at the base of the tail and some turn around upon landing to confuse potential predators from recognizing the true head orientation. This causes predators to approach from the true head end resulting in early visual detection or to attack the false head ending up with a beak of dusty scales.

Lycaenids are diverse in their food habits and apart from phytophagy, some of them are entomophagous, feeding on aphids, scale insects, and ant larvae. Some lycaenids even exploit their association with ants by inducing ants to feed them by regurgitation, a process called trophallaxis. Not all lycaenid butterflies need ants, but about 75% of species associate with ants, a relationship called myrmecophily. These associations can be mutualistic, parasitic, or predatory depending on the species.

In some species, larvae are attended and protected by ants while feeding on the host plant, and the ants receive sugar-rich honeydew from them, throughout the larval life, and in some species during the pupal stage. In other species, only the first few instars are spent on the plant, and the remainder of the larval lifespan is spent as a predator within the ant nest. It becomes a parasite, feeding on ant regurgitations, or a predator on the ant larvae. The caterpillars pupate inside the ants' nest and the ants continue to look after the pupae. Just before the adults emerge, the wings of the butterfly inside the pupal case detach from it, and the pupa becomes silvery. The adult butterfly emerges from the pupa after three to four weeks, still inside the ant nest. The butterfly must crawl out of the ant nest before it can expand its wings.

Several evolutionary adaptations enable these associations, including small glands on the skin of the caterpillars called "pore cupola organs". Caterpillars of many species have a gland on the seventh abdominal segment that produces honeydew and is called the "dorsal nectary gland" (also called "Newcomer's gland"). An eversible organ called the "tentacular organ" is present on the eighth abdominal segment and this is cylindrical and topped with a ring of spikes and emits chemical signals which are believed to help in communicating with ants.

Subfamilies

Many taxonomists only include the Lycaeninae, Theclinae, Polyommatinae, Poritiinae, Miletinae, and Curetinae under the Lycaenidae.
The Aphnaeinae, which used to be a tribe (Aphnaeini) within the Theclinae, were recently given subfamily rank too.

 Curetinae – sunbeams (Oriental or Palaearctic). Selected species:
 Curetis thetis – Indian sunbeam
 Miletinae – harvesters (mostly African, or Oriental, one Nearctic), probably all feed on aphids or their secretions. Selected species:
 Liphyra brassolis – moth butterfly (largest lycaenid)
 Poritiinae (Oriental and Afrotropical)
 Aphnaeinae (Afrotropical and Oriental)
 Theclinae – hairstreaks (usually tailed) and elfins (not tailed) (global). Selected species:
 Arhopala – oakblues
 Atlides halesus – great purple hairstreak
 Eumaeus atala – Atala
 Satyrium pruni – black hairstreak
 Lycaeninae – coppers (Holarctic). Selected species:
 Iophanus pyrrhias – Guatemalan copper
 Lycaena boldenarum – boulder copper
 Lycaena epixanthe – bog copper
 Lycaena rauparaha – Rauparaha's copper
 Lycaena dispar – large copper
 Lycaena phlaeas – small copper
 Lycaena heteronea – blue copper
 Polyommatinae – blues (global). Selected species:
 Celastrina ladon – spring azure
 Chilades – jewel blues
 Cupido comyntas – eastern tailed-blue
 Cupido minimus – small blue
 Cyaniris semiargus – mazarine blue
 Euphilotes battoides allyni – El Segundo blue
 Euphilotes pallescens arenamontana – Sand Mountain blue
 Glaucopsyche lygdamus – silvery blue
 Glaucopsyche lygdamus palosverdesensis – Palos Verdes blue
 Glaucopsyche xerces (extinct) – Xerces blue
 Icaricia icarioides fenderi – Fender's blue
 Phengaris arion – large blue
 Polyommatus icarus – common blue
 Pseudozizeeria maha – pale grass blue
 Plebejus argus – silver-studded blue
 Talicada nyseus – red Pierrot

Some older classifications used to include other subfamilies such as Liphyrinae (now Liphyrini, a tribe within Miletinae), Lipteninae (now Liptenini, a tribe within Poritiinae), or Riodininae (now a separate family: Riodinidae).

The fossil genus Lithodryas is usually (but not unequivocally) placed here; Lithopsyche is sometimes placed here, but sometimes in the Riodininae.

See also 

 List of lycaenid genera

References

Further reading 

Bridges, Charles A. (1994). Catalogue of the Family-Group, Genus-Group and Species-Group Names of the Riodinidae & Lycaenidae (Lepidoptera) of the World. Urbana, Ill.
 Eliot, J. N. (1973). "The higher classification of the Lycaenidae (Lepidoptera): a tentative arrangement". Bulletin of the British Museum (Natural History) (Entomology). 28: 371–505.
 Glassberg, Jeffrey (2001). Butterflies Through Binoculars, The West
 Guppy, Crispin S. & Shepard, Jon H. (2001). Butterflies of British Columbia 
 James, David G. and Nunnallee, David (2011). Life Histories of Cascadia Butterflies
 Pelham, Jonathan (2008). Catalogue of the Butterflies of the United States and Canada
 Pyle, Robert Michael (2002). The Butterflies of Cascadia

External links 

 Tree of Life Web Project
 
 "Family Lycaenidae". Insecta.pro.
 
 
 
 Royal Museum for Central Africa Images of Lycaenidae 
 Butterflies and Moths of North America
 Butterflies of America

 
Butterfly families
Taxa named by William Elford Leach
Papilionoidea